ClearSlide was a SaaS-based Sales Engagement platform that let users  share content / sales materials via email links or their viewer's link in a ‘Live Pitch’. ClearSlide was designed for sales and marketing teams, accessible primarily via an annual subscription model. Clearslide was acquired by Bigtincan in December of 2020.

History
ClearSlide was founded in October 2009, funded by the founders and through initial subscribers. The company did not raise funds until the year following its launch.  In August 2012, ClearSlide raised a $28 million series B round of financing, announcing that it was to fuel their rapid growth and expansion plans. On March 5, 2013 the company bought SlideRocket from VMware.  A second acquisition was announced on July 2, 2013, when ClearSlide bought Crunched, a rival cloud-based sales engagement platform. In February 2014, ClearSlide raised $50 million in Series C funding from their partnership with Social+Capital Partnership. This led to additional contributions from Greylock Partners, Bessemer Venture Partners and Felicis Ventures.

The company's products include Microsoft Dynamics Integration, Gong Integration, My ClearSlide, Slack Integration, and Salesforce Integration.

References

External links 
 Official site

Software companies based in California
Cloud applications
Companies based in San Francisco
Software companies established in 2009
Defunct software companies of the United States